Baksan is a town in the Kabardino-Balkar Republic, Russia, located  northwest of Nalchik on the left bank of the Baksan River (Terek's basin). Population:

History
It was founded in 1822 as a Russian military settlement. In the 1860s, the Kabarda settlement of Kuchmazukino was founded to the east of Baksan; it was renamed Staraya Krepost in 1920. In 1891, to the west of the settlement, the selo of Baksan was founded. Baksan and Staraya Krepost were merged in 1960. Urban-type settlement status was granted to it in 1965; town status was granted in 1967.

Administrative and municipal status
Within the framework of administrative divisions, Baksan serves as the administrative center of Baksansky District, even though it is not a part of it. As an administrative division, it is, together with one rural locality (the selo of Dygulybgey), incorporated separately as the town of republic significance of Baksan—an administrative unit with the status equal to that of the districts. As a municipal division, the town of republic significance of Baksan is incorporated as Baksan Urban Okrug.

Demographics
In 2002, population included:
Kabardians (86.8%)
Russians (9.6%)
other ethnicities, comprising less than 1% of population each

References

Notes

Sources

External links
Official website of Baksan 
Directory of organizations in Baksan 

Cities and towns in Kabardino-Balkaria
Cities and towns built in the Soviet Union